"My Own Way" is the fourth single by Duran Duran, originally released as a single on 16 November 1981.

The single was designed as a stop-gap release to capitalise on the Top 5 success of the band's previous single, "Girls on Film", but prior to the recording and release of the band's second album Rio (which was recorded in the early months of 1982).

"My Own Way" was another hit, peaking at #14 on the UK Singles Chart. It peaked at #10 in Australia. 
Despite its success, the single has often been cited by the band as one of their least favourite and is rarely played live. Keyboardist Nick Rhodes has expressed astonishment that "My Own Way" performed better than 1987's "Skin Trade", which ended the band's record of twelve consecutive Top 20 hits in the UK.

About the song
The single release of "My Own Way" has a fast tempo and "disco strings" arranged by Richard Myhill & Duran Duran.

A slower version was later recorded for the Rio album, with slightly different lyrics. This version dispensed with the disco strings in favour of a new wave style with echoing synths and was later remixed by David Kershenbaum for the Carnival EP, and this altered track appeared on the American re-issue of the Rio album on vinyl and cassette late in 1982. All CD pressings of Rio have used the original UK album mix.

The band's dislike of "My Own Way" is evinced by the song's omission from all of Duran Duran's compilation albums. Neither 1989's Decade nor 1998's Greatest included the track, although it came close on the latter. A promo for Greatest included both "My Own Way" and "Careless Memories", but the commercial release replaced them with 1990's "Serious" and 1997's "Electric Barbarella".

Music video
The video for "My Own Way" was set to the fast-paced single version of the song and featured a young Adrian Paul dressed like a matador. It was rarely played on MTV or VH1, and was quickly overshadowed by the other more famous videos for the Rio album.  Like those other videos, this one was directed by Russell Mulcahy.

"My Own Way" was filmed in a studio decorated entirely in red, black and white. The band performs the song while flamenco dancers twirl in the background, and a colourful parrot sits on the keyboards. The video was shot on 35mm film rather than video, a trend the band had started with their previous single "Girls on Film".

Small snippets of this video are seen on the projection screen in the video for "Is There Something I Should Know?" released in 1983, and it was part of the band's 1983 video album Duran Duran.  However, it was not included on the video compilations Decade (1989) or Greatest (1999), though it was included as a bonus track on the 2009 DVD release of Live at Hammersmith '82!

B-sides
The B-side of the UK 7-inch was "Like an Angel". The B-side of the UK 12-inch was "Like an Angel" and "My Own Way (Night Version)".

Versions and remixes
 Manchester Square Demo 4:38 - recorded on 12 December 1980, this version saw official release on the expanded 2009 rerelease of the Rio album.
 Single Version 3:40 - the original commercially released recording, from October 1981
 Night Versions 6:32 - the UK 12-inch Version. Owing to the lack of sampling technology at the time, the 7-inch backing track was copied and the tape physically spliced to extend it, then fresh overdubs were added.
 Instrumental Version 6:32 - the Night Version, minus the vocals. Initially appearing on a UK promo 12-inch, it was made available as a download-only supplement to the 2009 Rio re-release.
 UK Album Version 4:49 - completely rerecorded during the Rio album sessions, in early 1982.
 Brazilian Edit 3:42 - the UK Album Version, faded just over a minute early. It appeared on the Brazil-only Rio 7-inch EP.
 Carnival EP/US Album Remix 4:31 - the UK Album Version, remixed by David Kershenbaum for the US market. This version also appeared on the b-side of the UK Rio 12-inch, labelled simply "Remix" and with a 5-second longer fade.

Formats and track listing

7": EMI / EMI 5254 United Kingdom
 "My Own Way" (Single Version) - 3:39
 "Like an Angel" - 4:41

12": EMI / 12 EMI 5254 United Kingdom
 "My Own Way" (Night Version) - 6:31
 "Like an Angel" - 4:41
 "My Own Way" (Short Version) - 3:39

CD: Part of "Singles Box Set 1981–1985" boxset
 "My Own Way" (Short Version) - 3:39
 "Like an Angel" - 4:41
 "My Own Way" (Night Version) - 6:31

CD: Part of Rio 2009 Collectors Edition (CD1)
 "My Own Way" (Carnival Remix) - 4:29

CD: Part of Rio 2009 Collectors Edition (digital download/streaming)
 "My Own Way" (Instrumental) - 6:35

Chart history

Weekly Charts

Year-end charts

Other appearances
Apart from the single, "My Own Way" has also appeared on:

Albums:
Rio (1982)
Carnival (1982)
Night Versions: The Essential Duran Duran (1998)
Strange Behaviour (1999)
Singles Box Set 1981–1985 (2005)

Singles:
Rio (1982)

The compilation "Trash Companion #01" (2002) included "My Own Way (Version)".

Samples
In 2002, "My Own Way" was sampled by José Nunez, American music remixer and producer, for the dance song "Air Race", which became a sizeable club and airplay hit.

Personnel
Simon Le Bon - vocals
Nick Rhodes - keyboards
John Taylor - bass guitar
Roger Taylor - drums
Andy Taylor - guitar

Also credited:
 Colin Thurston - producer and engineer
 Renate - Technician
 Peter Saville, Peter Saville Associates, Manchester and Malcolm Garrett, Assorted iMaGes, London - sleeve design
 Arranged by (Strings) - Duran Duran and Richard Myhill

References

 Versions of My Own Way on Rio
 The Duran Duran Timeline: 1981

1981 singles
Duran Duran songs
Music videos directed by Russell Mulcahy
Song recordings produced by Colin Thurston
1981 songs
EMI Records singles
Songs written by Simon Le Bon
Songs written by John Taylor (bass guitarist)
Songs written by Roger Taylor (Duran Duran drummer)
Songs written by Andy Taylor (guitarist)
Songs written by Nick Rhodes